Bjelanovac   is a village in Croatia. It is connected by the D5 highway.

Populated places in Požega-Slavonia County
Lipik